is a passenger railway station in located in the city of  Izumi, Osaka Prefecture, Japan, operated by West Japan Railway Company (JR West).

Lines

Station layout
The station consists of two opposed side platforms connected by an underground passage. The station is staffed.

Platforms

Adjacent stations

|-
!colspan=5|JR West

History
Tonoki Station opened on 1 March 1940. With the privatization of the Japan National Railways (JNR) on 1 April 1987, the station came under the aegis of the West Japan Railway Company.

Station numbering was introduced in March 2018 with Tonoki being assigned station number JR-R34.

Passenger statistics
In fiscal 2019, the station was used by an average of 3898 passengers daily (boarding passengers only).

Surrounding area
 Takaishi City Hall

See also
List of railway stations in Japan

References

External links

 Tonoki Station Official Site

Railway stations in Osaka Prefecture
Railway stations in Japan opened in 1940
Takaishi, Osaka